Alexander Kincaid Mackenzie (1768–1830) was a 19th-century Scottish merchant who served as Lord Provost of Edinburgh from 1817 to 1819.

Life

He was born in Edinburgh in 1768. It is thought his father died young as his mother "Mrs Mackenzie" is noted as a merchant trading from the Luckenbooths, next to St Giles Cathedral in 1773. There seems a strong likelihood that he was connected to the Lord Provost of Edinburgh in 1776, Alexander Kincaid, who also had premises at the Luckenbooths. Alexander died in 1777 and Thomas may have been his illegitimate son.

By 1800 he was trading as a wine merchant in his own right, from the "head of James Court" on the Lawnmarket.

In 1806 he was living at Buchanan Court in Edinburgh's Old Town. He moved to a new house on Gayfield Square as soon as it was built (c.1808).

In 1810 a public (but anonymous) letter was sent to "Bailie Kincaid Mackenzie" accusing the Edinburgh Town Council of various financial improprieties. In 1818, during his period as Lord Provost, a similar accusation caused him to publish the Council's finances in full.

In 1819, at his house on the west side of Gayfield Square, he hosted a visit from Prince Leopold of Belgium, and this name was then used for the mew buildings under construction nearby, at the junction of Leith Walk and London Road, still known as Leopold Place.

He was noted in 1819 as an ex-President of the Edinburgh Magdalene Asylum for Fallen Women.

He died as he was sitting down to dinner at home, 5 Gayfield Square at the top of Leith Walk on 2 June 1830 aged 62.

He is buried on the central western terrace of New Calton Burial Ground in Edinburgh, facing south to Arthur's Seat, next to the grave of Sir Robert Christison.

Family

He was married to Catherine Hall (1782-1857). Their children included:

 Alexander Kincaid Mackenzie (c.1800-?), eldest son, married Jessie Rhind (1821-1845) sister of Alexander Henry Rhind, antiquary.
 Charlotte Mackenzie (1803-1876) married James Peter Mitchell
 Brigadier General James Mackenzie of the Bengal Cavalry (1804-1859) who died at Simla.
 William Hall Mackenzie (1808-1872)
 Catherine Mackenzie (1814-1851)
 Dr Patrick Mitchell Mackenzie (1821-1874) who spent many years in Tobago

References

1768 births
1830 deaths
Businesspeople from Edinburgh
Lord Provosts of Edinburgh